Robert Walker, Baron Walker of Gestingthorpe ,  (born 17 March 1938) is an English barrister and former Justice of the Supreme Court of the United Kingdom. He also serves as a Non-Permanent Judge of the Hong Kong Court of Final Appeal.

He sat in the House of Lords as a crossbencher until his retirement from the House on 17 March 2021.

Early life and non-judicial career
Born on 17 March 1938, the son of Ronald Robert Antony Walker by his wife Mary Helen, Walker was educated at Downside School and Trinity College, Cambridge from where he graduated in 1959 with a Bachelor of Arts degree in Classics and Law. He was called to the bar at Lincoln's Inn in 1960 and became a Queen's Counsel in 1982.

In 2010 he was the Treasurer of Lincoln's Inn.

He is an Honorary Fellow of Trinity College, Cambridge.

Lord Walker of Gestingthorpe has served on the Honorary Editorial Board of the Warwick Student Law Review since its inception in 2010.

Judicial career
In 1994, Walker was appointed a High Court Judge in the Chancery Division, and as is customary was then made a Knight Bachelor, before appointment as a Lord Justice of Appeal in 1997. He succeeded Lord Slynn of Hadley GBE as a Lord of Appeal in Ordinary in 2002 and was created a Life Peer as Baron Walker of Gestingthorpe, of Gestingthorpe in the County of Essex. He and nine other Lords of Appeal in Ordinary became Justices of the Supreme Court of the United Kingdom upon its inauguration on 1 October 2009.

Personal life
Lord Walker of Gestingthorpe married Suzanne Diana Leggi in 1962. They have one son (Robert, born 1963) and three daughters (Penelope Mary, born 1966; Julian Diana, born 1968; and Henrietta Solveig, born 1972).

Notable judgments
Re A (Children) (Conjoined Twins: Surgical Separation) [2001] Fam 147
Gillett v Holt [2000] 3 WLR 815

Moore Stephens v Stone Rolls Ltd [2009] UKHL 39
HJ and HT v Home Secretary [2010] UKSC 31
Futter & Anor v HMRC; Pitt & Anor v HMRC [2013] UKSC 26
, (2014) 17 HKCFAR 218
, (2018) 21 HKCFAR 370

Arms

External links
 www.parliament.uk
 Debrett's People of Today

References

1938 births
Living people
Crossbench life peers
People educated at Downside School
Alumni of Trinity College, Cambridge
Members of Lincoln's Inn
Chancery Division judges
Walker of Gestingthorpe
Walker of Gestingthorpe
English King's Counsel
20th-century King's Counsel
Members of the Privy Council of the United Kingdom
Members of the Judicial Committee of the Privy Council
Judges of the Supreme Court of the United Kingdom
Justices of the Court of Final Appeal (Hong Kong)
21st-century English judges
Knights Bachelor
Knights of Malta